The 1985 Richmond Spiders football team was an American football team that represented the University of Richmond as an independent during the 1985 NCAA Division I-AA football season. In their sixth season under head coach Dal Shealy, Richmond compiled an 8–3 record.

Schedule

References

Richmond
Richmond Spiders football seasons
Richmond Spiders